The  is a Shinto shrine located in Marunouchi in the Naka Ward in Nagoya, central Japan.

History 

It was established in the year 911 and is dedicated to the Shinto god Susanoo. Originally called Tennōsha (天王社), it was located south of Nagoya Castle next to the Nagoya Tōshō-gū (東照宮) and housed the guardian deity of the castle. It was moved to its present site in 1876, the past plot is now occupied by government buildings.

The Nagoya Shrine Tenno Festival is held every 15–16 July.

References

External links

Shinto shrines in Nagoya
Nagoya Castle